Amble is a coastal town on the North Sea coast in Northumberland, England.

Amble may also refer to:

 Amble, an unincorporated community in Winfield Township, Michigan, US
 River Amble, Cornwall, England, a tributary of the River Camel
 Alf Amble (1909–1950), Norwegian anti-Semitic activist and writer
 Lars Amble (born 1938), Swedish actor and director
 Michele Bachmann (born 1956 as Michele Amble), American politician
 Ambling gait or amble, any of a number of gaits for horses